The 2018–19 Toto Cup Al is the 34th season of the third-important football tournament in Israel since its introduction and the 13th tournament involving Israeli Premier League clubs only. 

Maccabi Tel Aviv are the defending champions.

Format changes
The four clubs playing in the Champions League and Europa League (Hapoel Be'er Sheva, Maccabi Tel Aviv, Beitar Jerusalem and Hapoel Haifa) will not take part in the group stage, while the remaining ten clubs were divided into two groups of five clubs. At the end of the group stage each of the group winners will qualify to the semi-finals. Hapoel Be'er Sheva and Hapoel Haifa will play (in the 2018 Israel Super Cup match) for a place in one of the semi-finals (meeting the group winner with the fewest points accumulated), while Maccabi Tel Aviv and Beitar Jerusalem will play for a place in the other semi-final (meeting the group winner with the most points accumulated). All the clubs will participate in classification play-offs.

Group stage
Groups were allocated according to geographic distribution of the clubs, with the northern clubs allocated to Group A, and the southern clubs allocated to Group B. Each club will play the other clubs once.

The matches are scheduled to start on 28 July 2018.

Group A

Group B

European qualification route

Israel Super Cup

UEFA qualifiers match

Classification play-offs

13-14th classification match

11-12th classification match

9-10th classification match

7-8th classification match

5-6th classification match

Semi-finals

Final

Final rankings

References

External links
 Official website  

Al
Toto Cup Al
Toto Cup Al